John Adam is an Australian television and theatre actor. He has had three roles in the soap opera Home and Away as Dave Porter (1990), Luke Cunningham (1993–94) and Senior Detective Atticus Decker (2016). From 2009 until the series' cancellation, Adam starred as Detective Senior Constable Nick Buchanan in City Homicide. He has also appeared in Water Rats, All Saints and Neighbours, as well as various theatre productions.

Career
Following his graduation from the National Institute of Dramatic Art (NIDA), Adam appeared in various television shows, including A Country Practice and E Street. From 1993 to 1994, Adam portrayed teacher Luke Cunningham in Home and Away. It was his second role in the show, having previously appeared as Dave Porter, a friend of Ben Lucini (Julian McMahon), in 1990. Producers asked Adam to return to the show four times, before he accepted the role of Luke.

In 1997, Adam had a recurring role as Michael Jeffries in Water Rats. The following year, he starred as Peter Carter in Tony Morphett's thriller television film 13 Gantry Row.

In April 2009, it was announced that Adam had joined the cast of the crime drama City Homicide as Detective Senior Constable Nick Buchanan. Adam relocated to Melbourne with his family for filming. He spoke with a homicide detective during his research for the role and described Nick as being "Driven. Independent. Curious."

In 2010, while working on City Homicide, Adam was also appearing in Dead Man's Cell Phone at the Melbourne Theatre Company.

Adam played Arnolde in the 2012 Bell Shakespeare production of The School for Wives, alongside Harriet Dyer and Meyne Wyatt. The following year, he played Don Cotter in the soap opera Neighbours.

From April 2014, Adam appeared in a production of The King and I, which marked his first musical theatre role. In 2016, Adam rejoined Home and Away in the recurring role of Atticus Decker.

Filmography

References

External links

1960s births
Year of birth uncertain
Living people
National Institute of Dramatic Art alumni
Australian male television actors
Male actors from Brisbane
20th-century Australian male actors
21st-century Australian male actors